Khải Định (chữ Hán: 啓定; born Nguyễn Phúc Bửu Đảo; 8 October 1885 – 6 November 1925) was the 12th emperor of the Nguyễn dynasty in Vietnam, reigning from 1916 to 1925. His name at birth was Prince Nguyễn Phúc Bửu Đảo. He was the son of Emperor Đồng Khánh, but he did not succeed him immediately.

Biography
Before Emperor Đồng Khánh's era came the eras of Emperor Thành Thái and Emperor Duy Tân, both of whom were exiled by the French for their resistance to the colonial regime. After this trouble, the French decided to enthrone Bửu Đảo as he was the son of the monarch who was the most submissive Nguyễn collaborator with the colonial regime, standing with the French colonizers and opposing any independence movements, Emperor Đồng Khánh.

Nguyễn Phúc Bửu Đảo became the nominal ruler of Annam on 18 May 1916, after the exile of Duy Tân (Nguyễn Phúc Vĩnh San) and took the name Khải Định for his reign, meaning "auger of peace and stability." He said he wanted to restore the prestige of the empire, but this was not possible with his close collaboration with the French occupiers. Although not satisfied with his position, Khải Định enacted a policy of close collaboration with the French government and was effectively a puppet political figurehead for the French colonial rulers, following all of their instructions to give "legitimacy" to French policies.

Because of this, Khải Định was very unpopular with the Vietnamese people. The nationalist leader Phan Châu Trinh accused him of selling out his country to the French and living in imperial luxury while the people were exploited by France. Nguyễn Ái Quốc (later known as Hồ Chí Minh) wrote a play about Khải Định called "The Bamboo Dragon" that ridiculed him as being all grand appearance and ceremony but a powerless puppet of the French government.

From 1919 onward, the Emperor made a decree that Vietnam cease to use Chinese as official written language and was replaced by Romanized Vietnamese.

In 1922, the Emperor's visit to France to see the Marseilles Colonial Exhibition was also ridiculed by nationalist leaders, who hated Vietnam's status as a colonial subject of France and saw nothing in the exhibition worth celebrating.

Emperor Khải Định's unpopularity reached its peak in 1923 when he authorized the French to raise taxes on the Vietnamese peasants, part of which was to pay for the building of his palatial tomb, and which caused a great deal of hardship. He also signed the orders of arrest against many nationalist leaders, such as Phan Bội Châu, forcing them into exile and having their followers who were captured beheaded.

Marriages and sexuality
When he was still Duke of Phụng Hóa, Emperor Khải Định married his first wife Trương Như Thị Tịnh in 1907. She left him in 1915 and became a nun, before he was enthroned. Upon ascending the throne, he married his second wife, Ân phi, Noble consort of the first rank Hồ Thị Chỉ (1902–1982) of An Truyền Hồ Đắc clan. She is a daughter of Hồ Đắc Trung, who became Annam's Minister for Public Instruction. Emperor Khải Định had his first and only son with one of his concubines, Hoàng Thị Cúc (1890–1980). She gave birth to Nguyễn Phúc Vĩnh Thụy (later Emperor Bảo Đại) in 1913. After Khải Định's ascension, she was given the title of Huệ tần, noble consort of the third rank, later elevated to the title Huệ phi, noble consort of the second rank.

Historical records and studies state that Emperor Khải Định only had homosexual desires. He rarely slept with his wives during his reign. He was close to his male guard, Nguyễn Đắc Vọng, and always slept with him.

Death 

Khải Định suffered poor health like his father and became a drug addict. He died of tuberculosis in the Imperial City of Huế, according to his concubine Ba Phi, who described him as "not interested in sex" and "physically weak".

Reign symbols

Gallery

See also 

 Tomb of Khải Định
 Khải Định Thông Bảo

References

External links 

Asian Historical Architecture: Tomb of Emperor Khai Dinh
Erdal Can Alkoçlar
Emperor Khai Dinh's tomb

1925 deaths
Nguyen dynasty emperors
1885 births
20th-century deaths from tuberculosis
LGBT royalty
LGBT heads of state
Vietnamese LGBT people
Tuberculosis deaths in Vietnam
Vietnamese monarchs